Grumpy Old Men or grumpy old man may refer to:

People
 Grumpy old men, colloquial term referring to sufferers of irritable male syndrome

Art, entertainment, and media
 "Grumpy Old Man", a 2011 episode of Family Guy
 Grumpy Old Men (film), a 1993 comedy film starring Jack Lemmon and Walter Matthau
 Grumpy Old Men (TV series), a 2000s BBC Two television programme
 Grumpy Old Men, an Australian TV sports programme hosted by Kevin Bartlett
 Grumpy Old Man, a character portrayed by Dana Carvey on the television show Saturday Night Live: See